Live & Rare Volume 1 is a live album released by heavy metal band Quiet Riot.

Track listing

Credits

Quiet Riot
Tracks 1-9
Kevin DuBrow: Vocals
Carlos Cavazo: Guitar
Rudy Sarzo: Bass
Frankie Banali: Drums & Percussion

DuBrow
Tracks 10-12
Kevin DuBrow: Vocals
Bob Steffan: Guitar
Chuck Wright: Bass
Frankie Banali: Drums & Percussion

CD credits
Live compilation produced by: Frankie Banali
DuBrow demo produced by: Kevin DuBrow and Frankie Banali
Mixed and mastered by: Neil Citron
Cover model: Jen Hilton
Live Sound Engineer: Ken DiMaio

Notes
Some listeners have complained about a two-second gap between live tracks, breaking up the sound of crowd noise.
The three demo tracks were recorded under the name DuBrow, not Quiet Riot, as during this period Quiet Riot were broken up.

Quiet Riot live albums
2005 live albums